The Clifford family was a family of bankers, merchants and regenten of English descent who were active in Amsterdam during the sixteenth through eighteenth centuries. The family originated in northern England, although the surname originated in the village of Clifford, Herefordshire. Northern England was the home of the noble Clifford family, since Roger Clifford was born in Cumberland and died in Brough Castle in Westmorland. There is no evidence that the Clifford banking family is descended from a nobleman named Clifford, who fought for William I of England.

History

Richard and Henry Clifford

The oldest known ancestor is John Clifford, who was a tenant in Aylsham. His son Richard Clifford was born in Aylsham. He studied at Corpus Christi College, Cambridge, and in 1569 became rector of Landbeach, a village just north of Cambridge, though he was also canon of Stow. His wife was Alice; her maiden name is unknown.

Henry Clifford (1576-1628) was born in Landbeach to Richard and Alice Clifford. He also studied at Corpus Christi.

George Clifford I
Henry's son, George Clifford, relocated to Amsterdam between 1634 and 1640. This George or Joris (1623-1680) married Abigail Bouwens in 1648 and spent the rest of his life on the Zeedijk. From 1654 he had an account with the Amsterdamsche Wisselbank. Six of his children were baptised in Amsterdam's Presbyterian Church, and two in the Oude Kerk. In 1664 he traded on Barbados. (By 1660, Barbados generated more trade than all the other English colonies combined.) According to the inventory after his death, he traded in tea, tobacco, sugar, cotton, spices, herbs, dyes like indigo and dragon's blood.

George Clifford II
George Clifford II (1657-1727, son of George I) began his career on the Leliegracht Canal. He represented the Bank of England. From 1696 to 1700 he was director of the Sociëteit van Suriname. In 1707 Clifford & Co bank had the largest balance at the Bank of Amsterdam. In 1709 George bought the estate Hartekamp in Heemstede, buying it for 22,000 guilders from Johan Hinlopen.

From 1701 George and his brother Isaäc (1665-1729) ran their father's business under the name 'George en Isaäc Clifford & Co.'. The brothers split in 1713 before or after the bank arranged a loan to Charles VI, Holy Roman Emperor and to Augustus III of Poland.

George Clifford III

George Clifford II's only son was George Clifford (1685-1760), who is best known as patron of the Swedish naturalist Carl Linnaeus, whom he employed as 'hortulanus' to catalog the family's unique collection of plants, herbarium and library. The result was Linnaeus' book Hortus Cliffortianus, whose publication costs were paid by George Clifford III. In 1739 George Clifford III made a sworn statement to Nicolaes Geelvinck, secretary in the town hall, that he was descended from Henry Clifford from Landbeach. The large part of his botanical collection, the  Clifford Herbarium, is in the Natural History Museum, London.

Later history 
In the mid-18th century members of the family began to enter the city-government of Amsterdam. The Cliffords regularly lent money to banks in Saint Petersburg and Moscow, the English and Danish governments, and owned plantations in Suriname. It went bankrupt during the Crisis of 1772 in December, after price overshooting on the Amsterdam stock market, bringing down a number of other bankers and their firms, such as  Pels & Zonen. In the mid-19th century the Clifford family moved to The Hague. The family archive was lost in an incendiary raid on Dalfsen during World War II.

Notes

Bibliography
 L. Albers, A.J. Kramer, J.L.P.M. Krol & I. van Thiel-Stroman. Het landgoed de Hartekamp in Heemstede. Heemstede, VOHB, 1982.
 Johan E. Elias. De vroedschap van Amsterdam 1578-1795. Haarlem, 1905. Twee delen. Herdruk in 1963.

English bankers
Dutch bankers
People from Aylsham
Dutch patrician families
Banking families
European families of English ancestry